Mame Bassine Thiaw (born 11 November 1986) is a Senegalese footballer who plays as a forward. She has been a member of the Senegal women's national team.

Profile
Thiaw capped for Senegal at senior level during the 2012 African Women's Championship.

References

1986 births
Living people
Women's association football forwards
Senegalese women's footballers
Senegal women's international footballers